This list includes Summer and Winter Australian Paralympic Medallists up to the 2014 Sochi Winter Paralympics.

References

 
Australia at the Paralympics